Susilo is both a given name and a surname. Notable people with the name include:

 Ronald Susilo (born 1979), Singaporean badminton player of Chinese Indonesian descent
 Susilo Bambang Yudhoyono (born 1949), Indonesian politician and army general
 Susilo Wonowidjojo, Indonesian businessman